Agyneta martensi is a species of sheet weaver found in China. It was described by Tanasevitch in 2006.

References

martensi
Spiders described in 2006
Spiders of China